Pseudanthus divaricatissimus is a rare shrub known from scattered locations in central New South Wales between Muswellbrook and Bega.

References

Flora of New South Wales
divaricatissimus
Picrodendraceae